Valenzuela may refer to:

Places
Valenzuela, Paraguay
Valenzuela, Metro Manila, Philippines
Valenzuela, Spain
Valenzuela de Calatrava, Spain
Valenzuela, Louisiana

Other uses 
 Valenzuela (surname), including a list of people with the name
 Valenzuela (insect), a genus of barklice in the family Caeciliusidae

See also 
 Venezuela (disambiguation)